Euchrysops migiurtiniensis is a butterfly in the family Lycaenidae. It is found in Somaliland.

References

Butterflies described in 1946
Euchrysops
Endemic fauna of Somalia